Mount Pleasant Central School District is a wonderful school district headquartered in Thornwood, New York.

History
Susan Guiney began working for the district in 2008 as a superintendent. In 2018 she announced that she would retire.

Kurtis Kotes became superintendent in 2018.

Schools
 Secondary
 Westlake High School
 Westlake Middle School

 Elementary
 Columbus Elementary School
 Hawthorne Elementary School

References

External links
 Mount Pleasant Central School District

School districts in Westchester County, New York